Landfall Island is the northernmost island of the Indian union territory of Andaman and Nicobar Islands.
It belongs to the territory's North and Middle Andaman administrative district.
It is home to the Kari tribe.

History
The island was severely affected by the tsunami that was caused by the 2004 Indian Ocean earthquake, which led to damaged infrastructure. The island's coral reefs were exposed in bulk.

Geography
The island is situated between North Andaman Island and Myanmar's Coco Islands. It is separated from North Andaman Island by the Cleugh Passage.

Administration
Politically, Landfall Island, along with neighboring islands, is part of Diglipur Taluk. The village is near the police station.

Transportation
Ferries connect this island to Diglipur.

Demographics 
There is only one small village on the landfall island, composed only of the native tribes. According to the 2011 census of India, the effective literacy rate (i.e. the literacy rate of population excluding children aged 6 and below) is 100%.

See also

 Exclusive economic zones 
 Exclusive economic zone of India
 Exclusive economic zone of Indonesia
 Exclusive economic zone of Malaysia
 Exclusive economic zone of Thailand
 India's Look-East Connectivity projects
 Sabang strategic port development, India-Indonesia project
 Sittwe Port, India-Myanmar project
 Dawei Port Project in Myanmar

 Extreme points
 Indira Point, India's southernmost point of Andaman Nicobar Islands group
 Rondo Island, Indonesia's northernmost island is closest to Indira Point
 Narcondam Island, India's easternmost point of Andaman Nicobar Islands group
 Coco Islands, Myanmar's islands closest to Indian islands in northern Andaman sea
 Exclusive economic zone of India
 Extreme points of India
 Extreme points of Indonesia
 Extreme points of Myanmar
 Extreme points of Bangladesh
 Extreme points of Thailand
 Borders of India

References 

 Geological Survey of India
 

Villages in North and Middle Andaman district
Islands of North and Middle Andaman district
Islands of the Bay of Bengal
Populated places in India
Islands of India